

Events

Year overall 

 In Italy, Diabolik, started softly the previous year, becomes a growing success and finds its definitive shape.  In a series of classic stories (The elusive criminal, Diabolik arrested, Atrocious revenge, Buried alive) Diabolik begins to use the Jaguar E-Type, the rubber masks and the shelters, leaves his cover identity as Walter Dorian, ends dramatically his affair with the nurse Elisabeth Gray and begins a long love-story with Eva Kant.

January 
 January 26: The first issue of the British comics magazine Boys' World is published. It will run until 1964. 
 The first issue of the Catholic magazine Messaggero dei ragazzi (The Boys’ herald) is published in Padua by the Friars Minor of the Basilica of Saint Anthony. In the next decades, the magazine, in spite of its limited distribution, will host the works of important cartoonists such as Dino Battaglia and Hugo Pratt.
Sergio Aragones makes his debut in MAD Magazine #76.
 Jack Miller and Joe Certa's Zook makes his debut.
Fantastic Four (1961 series) #10 – Marvel Comics
The Incredible Hulk (1962 series) #5 – Marvel Comics
Journey into Mystery (1952 series) #88 – Marvel Comics
Kid Colt Outlaw (1948 series) #108 – Marvel Comics
Strange Tales (1951 series) #104 – Marvel Comics
Tales of Suspense (1959 series) #37 – Marvel Comics
Tales to Astonish (1959 series) #39 – Marvel Comics
Two-Gun Kid (1948 series) #61 – Marvel Comics
The Purple Smurfs (original title Les Schtroumpfs noirs), by Peyo, first album of the Smurfs.
Oddbal Odissey by Carl Barks, on Uncle Scrooge.

February
 February 16: The final issue of the British comics magazine Knockout is published, after which it merges with Valiant.
February 4: The first chapter of Jacovitti’s Baby Rocket, about the interstellar adventures of a half-notch gangster, is published in Il giorno dei ragazzi.
February 7: The first episode of Asterix and the Banquet by Goscinny and Uderzo, is prepublished in Pilote. The story marks the debut of Dogmatix, Obelix' dog.
Fantastic Four (1961 series) #11 – Marvel Comics
Journey into Mystery (1952 series) #89 – Marvel Comics
Magnus, Robot Fighter 4000 A.D. marks the debut of Russ Manning's Magnus Robot Fighter. 
Rawhide Kid (1955 series) #32 – Marvel Comics
Strange Tales (1951 series) #105 – Marvel Comics
Tales of Suspense (1959 series) #38 – Marvel Comics
Tales to Astonish (1959 series) #40 – Marvel Comics

March
 March 2: The final issue of the British comics magazine Swift is published. It merges with Eagle afterwards. 
 March 3: In L'arresto di Diabolik, the third issue of Angela Giussani and Luciana Giussani's Diabolik, Eva Kant makes her debut. Because this story, the two sisters endure a proceedings for "incitement to corruption".
March 10–17: The story Topolino e l’uomo di Altacraz (Mickey and the man of Altacraz), by Romano Scarpa is first prepublished in  Topolino, a story vaguely inspired by Birdman of Alcatraz.
 March 18: Jerry Marcus' Trudy makes its debut. It will run until 2000.
The Amazing Spider-Man (1963 series) #1 – Marvel Comics
Fantastic Four (1961 series) #12 – Marvel Comics (First battle of The Thing and The Hulk)
The Incredible Hulk (1962 series) #6 – Marvel Comics
Journey into Mystery (1952 series) #90 – Marvel Comics
Kid Colt Outlaw (1948 series) #109 – Marvel Comics
Strange Tales (1951 series) #106 – Marvel Comics
Tales of Suspense (1959 series) #39 – Marvel Comics – First appearance of Iron Man
Tales to Astonish (1959 series) #41 – Marvel Comics
Two-Gun Kid (1948 series) #62 – Marvel Comics
 Uncle Scrooge (1953 series) — Dell; "Uncle Scrooge, The Status Seeker" by Carl Barks

April
 April 13: The first issue of the Flemish children's magazine Ohee is published, supplement of the newspaper Het Volk. It will run until 31 December 1977.
 Black Cat (1946 series), with issue #65, canceled by Harvey Comics
Fantastic Four (1961 series) #13 – Marvel Comics
Fantastic Four Annual (1963 series) #1 – Marvel Comics
 Reintroduction of Atlantis into Marvel Comics continuity.
Journey into Mystery (1952 series) #91 – Marvel Comics
 Metal Men #1 (April/May cover-date) — DC Comics
Rawhide Kid (1955 series) #33 – Marvel Comics
Strange Tales (1951 series) #107 – Marvel Comics
Tales of Suspense (1959 series) #40 – Marvel Comics
Tales to Astonish (1959 series) #42 – Marvel Comics

May
 May 13: The first episode of Peter O'Donnell and Jim Holdaway's Modesty Blaise is published. 
 May 23: Mars Ravelo and Jim Fernandez's Captain Barbell makes his debut. 
 May 25: The final episode of Oskar Lebeck and Alden McWilliams' newspaper comic Twin Earths is published. 
The Amazing Spider-Man (1963 series) #2 – Marvel Comics
Fantastic Four (1961 series) #14 – Marvel Comics
Journey into Mystery (1952 series) #92 – Marvel Comics
Kid Colt Outlaw (1948 series) #110 – Marvel Comics
Sgt. Fury (1963 series) #1 – Marvel Comics. First appearance of Sgt. Fury and his Howling Commandos.
Strange Tales (1951 series) #108 – Marvel Comics
Tales of Suspense (1959 series) #41 – Marvel Comics
Tales to Astonish (1959 series) #43 – Marvel Comics
Two-Gun Kid (1948 series) #63 – Marvel Comics

June
 June 1: The final episode of Mort Walker and Jerry Dumas' Sam's Strip is published.
 June 8: The final episode of Ken Reid's Jonah is published in The Beano.
 June 11: The final episode of Andries Brandt's Holle Pinkel is published.
 June 13: The first issue of Il pioniere dell’Unità, (comic supplement to the PCI official newspaper L’unità) is published; it takes the place of the magazine Il pioniere.
June 16: The first issue of ABC dei ragazzi (The boys’ ABC, supplement to the weekly magazine ABC), is published in Milan.
Fantastic Four (1961 series) #15 – Marvel Comics
Journey into Mystery (1952 series) #93 – Marvel Comics
My Greatest Adventure #80 – DC Comics – first appearance of the Doom Patrol, created by Arnold Drake, Bob Haney and Bruno Premiani.
Rawhide Kid (1955 series) #34 – Marvel Comics
Strange Tales (1951 series) #109 – Marvel Comics
Strange Tales Annual (1962 series) #2 – Marvel Comics
Tales of Suspense (1959 series) #42 – Marvel Comics
Tales to Astonish (1959 series) #44 – Marvel Comics
First appearance of the Wasp
 Young Love #38 (June/July issue) — final issue published by Prize Comics; title sold to and continued by DC Comics
 Young Romance #124 (June/July issue) — final issue published by Prize Comics; title sold to and continued by DC Comics
A Duck's-eye View of Europe, by Carl Barks, on Walt Disney's Comics and Stories..

July
 July 8: Alex Graham's Fred Basset makes its debut.
 July 21: in L’isola della Paura (Fear island) by Guido Nolitta and Gallieno Ferri two important recurring characters of Zagor universe, the mad doctor Hellinger and the nice cheater Trampy, make their debut.
The Amazing Spider-Man (1963 series) #3 – Marvel Comics
 First appearance of Doctor Octopus
Fantastic Four (1961 series) #16 – Marvel Comics
Gunsmoke Western (1955 series), with issue #77, canceled by Marvel Comics
Journey into Mystery (1952 series) #94 – Marvel Comics
Kid Colt Outlaw (1948 series) #111 – Marvel Comics
Sgt. Fury (1963 series) #2 – Marvel Comics
Strange Tales (1951 series) #110 – Marvel Comics
 First appearance of Doctor Strange, Ancient One & Nightmare (Marvel Comics)
Tales of Suspense (1959 series) #43 – Marvel Comics
Tales to Astonish (1959 series) #45 – Marvel Comics
Two-Gun Kid (1948 series) #64 – Marvel Comics

August
 August 8: The first episode of Jacques Devos' Génial Olivier is published in Spirou.
Fantastic Four (1961 series) #17 – Marvel Comics
House of Secrets #61 – DC Comics. First appearance of Eclipso by writer Bob Haney and artist Lee Elias
Journey into Mystery (1952 series) #95 – Marvel Comics
Justice League of America #21 – the first team-up of the Justice League and the Justice Society of America as well as the first use of the term "Crisis" in reference to a crossover between Golden Age and Silver Age characters.
Rawhide Kid (1955 series) #35 – Marvel Comics
Strange Tales (1951 series) #111 – Marvel Comics
 First appearance of Baron Mordo and Asbestos Man.
Tales of Suspense (1959 series) #44 – Marvel Comics
Tales to Astonish (1959 series) #46 – Marvel Comics
 Young Romance #125 (August/September issue) — DC Comics, continuing numbering from Prize Comics series

September
The Amazing Spider-Man (1963 series) #4 – Marvel Comics
 First appearance of Sandman
Avengers (1963 series) #1 – Marvel Comics
 First appearance of Avengers
Fantastic Four (1961 series) #18 – Marvel Comics
 First appearance of Super-Skrull
Green Lantern #23 – DC Comics
Journey into Mystery (1952 series) #96 – Marvel Comics
Kid Colt Outlaw (1948 series) #112 – Marvel Comics
Sgt. Fury (1963 series) #3 – Marvel Comics
Strange Tales (1951 series) #112 – Marvel Comics
Tales of Suspense (1959 series) #45 – Marvel Comics
 First appearance of Jack Frost, Happy Hogan & Pepper Potts
Tales to Astonish (1959 series) #47 – Marvel Comics
Two-Gun Kid (1948 series) #65 – Marvel Comics
Uncanny X-Men (1963 series) #1 – Marvel Comics
 First appearance of The X Men (Consisting of Professor X, Angel, Beast, Cyclops, Marvel Girl, and Iceman), Magneto, & Xavier's School for Gifted Youngsters
 Young Love #39 (September/October issue) — DC Comics, continuing numbering from Prize Comics series

October
October 17: The first episode of the Lucky Luke story Les Dalton se rachètent, by Goscinny and Morris, is prepublished in Spirou.
 October 20: An episode of Charles M. Schulz' Peanuts which pokes fun at school prayer causes controversy and angry readers' letters.
October 31: Jean Giraud's Blueberry is first published in Pilote.
The Amazing Spider-Man (1963 series) #5 – Marvel Comics
Fantastic Four (1961 series) #19 – Marvel Comics
First appearance of Rama Tut
Journey into Mystery (1952 series) #97 – Marvel Comics
Rawhide Kid (1955 series) #36 – Marvel Comics
Strange Tales (1951 series) #113 – Marvel Comics
Tales of Suspense (1959 series) #46 – Marvel Comics
Tales to Astonish (1959 series) #48 – Marvel Comics

November
 November 7: Greg's Achille Talon makes its debut.
 November 16: The British comics magazine The Wizard merges with The Rover and becomes Rover and Wizard, under which title it will continue until August 1969. 
 November 22: The comic strip Miss Caroline: The Little Girl in the Big White House by Gerald Gardner and Frank B. Johnson is cancelled after U.S. President John F. Kennedy is murdered. The comic had only ran for about a few months.
The Amazing Spider-Man (1963 series) #6 – Marvel Comics
First appearance of Lizard (comics) and Billy Connors.
Avengers (1963 series) #2 – Marvel Comics
Fantastic Four (1961 series) #20 – Marvel Comics
Journey into Mystery (1952 series) #98 – Marvel Comics
First appearance of Cobra (comics)
Kid Colt Outlaw (1948 series) #113 – Marvel Comics
Sgt. Fury (1963 series) #4 – Marvel Comics
Strange Tales (1951 series) #114 – Marvel Comics
Begins monthly Doctor Strange back-up story
Tales of Suspense (1959 series) #47 – Marvel Comics
Tales to Astonish (1959 series) #49 – Marvel Comics
First appearance of Henry "Hank" Pym as Giant-Man
Two-Gun Kid (1948 series) #66 – Marvel Comics
Uncanny X-Men (1963 series) #2 – Marvel Comics

December
December 5: The first episode of Asterix and Cleopatra, by Goscinny and Uderzo, is prepublished in Pilote..
December 12: A tiny dog, introduced in René Goscinny and Albert Uderzo's Astérix album Asterix and the Banquet earlier this year, receives a name through a readers' contest: Dogmatix, which is first revealed to the public in an issue of Pilote.
 December 12: The final episode of Clarence D. Russell's Pete the Tramp is published. 
 December 18: The final issue of the Flemish comics magazine, De Kleine Zondagsvriend is published.
The Amazing Spider-Man (1963 series) #7 – Marvel Comics
Fantastic Four (1961 series) #21 – Marvel Comics
 First appearance of Hate-Monger, First Nick Fury in present-day
Journey into Mystery (1952 series) #99 – Marvel Comics
Rawhide Kid (1955 series) #37 – Marvel Comics
Strange Tales (1951 series) #115 – Marvel Comics
Tales of Suspense (1959 series) #48 – Marvel Comics
 First appearance of Iron Man's red & gold armor
Tales to Astonish (1959 series) #50 – Marvel Comics
 In Italy, the first issue of Braccio di Ferro (Bianconi), containing Popeye’s adventures written by Italian authors, produced by Classici Audacia (Mondadori) is published.
 The first issue of the Italian monthly Il Piccolo Ranger is published (Bonelli).

Specific date unknown
 DC Comics purchases two Prize Comics romance titles, Young Love and Young Romance, continuing their numbering.
 Shueisha publishes Margaret.
 Alfredo Alcala's Voltar makes its debut.
 Jim Berry's Berry's World debuts. 
 Mauricio de Sousa's The Funnies (Monica's Gang) and The Tribe (Monica's Gang) and Horacio's World debut. 
 The final issue of the Argentine comics magazine Hora Cero is published.
 The final episode of Malcolm Judge's Colonel Crackpot's Circus is published.
 The final episode of Horace Boyten, Stewart Pride and Evelyn Flinders'  The Silent Three is published. 
 The final episode of Birgitta Lilliehöök's Spara och Slösa is published.
 The final episode of Brian Lewis' The Suicide Six is published.
 The final episode of Al Jaffee's Tall Tales is published.

Births

Deaths

January
 January 2: Joaquín Buigas, Spanish comics writer (La familia Ulises), dies at age 76.
 January 18: Francisco Valença, Portuguese comics artist and illustrator, passes away at age 80.

February
 February 18: Vadim Lazarkevich, Russian-Bulgarian illustrator and comics artist (Vesel Putniks Balloon, The Little Barber), passes away at age 67.
 February 26: Charles Folkard, British illustrator and comics artist (Teddy Tail), dies at age 84.

March
 March 23: Maurice Boyer, aka Moriss, French actor, comedian, illustrator, caricaturist and cartoonist, dies at age 88.
 Specific date in March unknown: Koos Schadée, Dutch comics artist and illustrator, dies at an unknown age.

May
 May 3: Alejandro Del Prado, aka Calé, Argentine cartoonist and comics artist (Buenos Aires Intimo), dies at age 37.

July
 July 2: Alicia Patterson, American publisher and comics writer (Deathless Deer), dies at age 56 of complications following stomach surgery for an ulcer. 
 July 7: François-Joseph Herman, Belgian comics artist (worked for Studio Vandersteen and made several one-shot stories of his own for Tintin), passes away at age 31.

August
 August 16: Ralph Fuller, American comics artist (Oaky Doaks), passes away at age 73.
 August 30: Jan Lunde, Norwegian comics artist (Pappa og Pjokken, Skomakker Bekk of Tvililligene Hans, Professor Skjeel, Dimpen og Dumpen), dies at age 74.
 August 31: Willem Gerrit van de Hulst Sr., Dutch novelist and comics writer (In de Soete Suikerbol), dies at age 83.

September
 September 19: David Low, New Zealand-British cartoonist and comics artist (Colonel Blimp), passes away at age 62.
 September 20: Jan Wiegman, Dutch comics artist and illustrator, dies at age 79.

October
 October 9: Leonard Sansone, American comics artist (Wolf Man, Willie), dies in a traffic accident at age 46.
 October 23: Clarence D. Russell, American comics artist (Pete the Tramp, The Tucker Twins), dies at age 68.
 October 25: Lewis Baumer, British caricaturist, cartoonist, illustrator and comics artist, dies at age 93.

December
 December 1: Jimmy Hatlo, American comics artist (They'll Do It Every Time, Little Iodine), dies at age 65.
 December 12: Wynne W. Davies, Australian illustrator and comics artist (The Strange Adventures of Percy the Pommy), passes away at age 71.
 December 18: Bruce Russell, aka Bruce Barr, American sports cartoonist and comics artist (Rollo Rollingstone), passes away at age 60.

Specific date unknown
 Gilbert Lawford Dalton, British comics writer (Wilson the Wonder Athlete), dies at age 48 or 49.
 Andrés Guevara, Paraguayan illustrator and comics artist (Blanca Nieve y Pío-Pío), dies at age 58 or 59.
 Katsuishi Kabashima, Japanese illustrator and comic artist (The Adventures of Sho-Chan), dies at age 74 or 75.
 Harry Mace, American comics artist (Amy), dies at age 40.
 Arthur Mansbridge, British illustrator and comics artist (worked for the magazine Golden), dies at age 85.
 Les Such, Australian comics artist (Buster Braddock, Rip Weston), dies at age 62 or 63.
 Arnold Warden, British comics artist (Snowdrop's Zoo, Tuffy and His Magic Tail), dies at age 70 or 71.

First issues by title

DC Comics 
Metal Men
 Release: April/May. Writer: Robert Kanigher. Artist: Ross Andru & Mike Esposito

Marvel Comics 
The Amazing Spider-Man
 Release: March. Writer: Stan Lee. Artist: Steve Ditko

The Avengers
 Release: September. Writer: Stan Lee. Artist: Jack Kirby

Sgt. Fury and his Howling Commandos
 Release: May. Writer: Stan Lee. Artist: Jack Kirby

The X-Men
 Release: September. Writer: Stan Lee. Artist: Jack Kirby

Other publishers
Das Kampf
 Release: by Vaughn Bodē (self-published). Writer/Artist: Vaughn Bodē

Initial appearance by character name

DC Comics 
Reverse-Flash, in The Flash #139 (September)
Eclipso, in House of Secrets #61 (August)
Tattooed Man, in Green Lantern #23 (September)
Negative Man, in My Greatest Adventure #80 (June)
Elasti-Girl , in My Greatest Adventure #80 (June)
Chief, in My Greatest Adventure #80 (June)
Robotman (Cliff Steele), in My Greatest Adventure #80 (June)
Mera, in Aquaman #11 (October)
Element Lad, in Adventure Comics #307 (April)
Doctor Polaris, in Green Lantern #21 (June)
General Immortus, in My Greatest Adventure #80 (June)
Heat Wave, in The Flash #140 (November)
Queen Bee, in Justice League of America #23 (November)
Catman, in Detective Comics #311 (January)
Doctor Hurt, in Batman #156 (June)
Shark, in Green Lantern #24 (October)
Rainbow Girl, in Adventure Comics #309 (June)
Lightning Lass, in Adventure Comics #308 (May)
Paul Gambi, in The Flash #141 (December)
Night Girl, in Adventure Comics #306 (March)
Polar Boy, in Adventure Comics #306 (March)
Chlorophyll Kid, in Adventure Comics #306 (March)
Ron-Karr, in Adventure Comics #314 (November)
Stone Boy, in Adventure Comics #306 (March)
Fire Lad, in Adventure Comics #306 (March)

Marvel Comics 
 Ancient One – Strange Tales #110
 Angel – Uncanny X-Men #1 (Sept.)
 The Avengers – Avengers #1 (Sept.)
 Baron Mordo – Strange Tales #111 (Aug.)
 Beast – Uncanny X-Men #1 (Sept.)
 Chameleon – The Amazing Spider-Man #1 (Mar.)
 Cobra (comics) – Journey into Mystery #98 (Nov.)
 Crimson Dynamo – Tales of Suspense #46 (Oct.)
 Cyclops – Uncanny X-Men #1 (Sept.)
 Doctor Octopus – The Amazing Spider-Man #3 (July)
 Doctor Strange – Strange Tales #110 (July)
 The Eel in Strange Tales #112 (Sept.)
 Nick Fury – Sgt. Fury and his Howling Commandos #1 (May)
 Giant-Man – Tales to Astonish #49 – Marvel Comics (Nov.)
 Happy Hogan – Tales of Suspense #45 (Sept.)
 Hate-Monger – Fantastic Four #21 (Dec.)
 Iceman – Uncanny X-Men #1 (Sept.)
 Impossible Man – Fantastic Four #11 (Feb.)
 Iron Man — Tales of Suspense #39 (Mar.)
 Jack Frost (later Blizzard)- Tales of Suspense #45 (Sept.)
 John Jameson – Amazing Spider-Man #1 (July)
 J. Jonah Jameson – Amazing Spider-Man #1 (July)
 Kala – Tales of Suspense #43 (July)
 Lava Men – Journey into Mystery #97 (Oct.)
 Lizard – The Amazing Spider-Man #6 (Nov.)
 Willie Lumpkin – Fantastic Four #11 (Feb.)
 Mad Thinker & his Awesome Android — Fantastic Four #15 (June)
 Magneto – Uncanny X-Men #1 (Sept.)
 Marvel Girl – Uncanny X-Men #1 (Sept.)
 Melter – Tales of Suspense #47 (Nov.)
 Metal Master — The Incredible Hulk #6 (Mar.)
 Mister Doll – Tales of Suspense #48 (Dec.)
 Mister Hyde (comics) – Journey into Mystery #99 (Dec.)
 Molecule Man – Fantastic Four #20 (Nov.)
 Nightmare – Strange Tales #110
 Paste Pot Pete (later The Trapster) – Strange Tales #104
 Pepper Potts – Tales of Suspense #45 (Sept.)
 Plantman – Strange Tales #113 (Oct.)
 Porcupine – Tales to Astonish #48 (Oct.)
 Radioactive Man – Journey into Mystery #93 (June)
 Rama Tut (later Kang the Conqueror)  – Fantastic Four #19 (Oct.)
 Red Ghost – Fantastic Four #13 (Apr.)
 Sandman – The Amazing Spider-Man #4 (Sept.)
 Space Phantom – Avengers #2 (Nov.)
 Super-Skrull in Fantastic Four #18 (Sept.)
 Surtur – Journey into Mystery #97 (Oct.)
 Tyrannus – The Incredible Hulk #5 (Jan.)
 Uatu (The Watcher) – Fantastic Four #13 (Apr.)
 Vanisher – Uncanny X-Men #2 (Nov.)
 The Voice – Tales to Astonish #42 (Apr.)
 The Vulture – Amazing Spider-Man #2 (May)
 Wasp – Tales to Astonish #44 (June)
 Human Top (later Whirlwind) – Tales to Astonish #50 (Dec.)
 Professor X – Uncanny X-Men #1 (Sept.)
 The X Men – Uncanny X-Men #1 (Sept.)

Independent publishers 

 Dogmatix, by Goscinny and Uderzo, in Asterix and the banquet. 
 Eva Kant, Diabolik’s lover and partner, by the Giussani sisters, in Diabolik arrested (March). 
Madame Min – Disney (June)
 Hellingen, mad scientist and Zagor's antagonist, by Guido Nolitta and Gallieno Ferri, in On the Titan's footprints (August) 
 Blueberry, by Charlier and Giraud, in Fort Navajo (October)

References